"Lento" (English: "Slow") is  the second single from the third album by Mexican singer Julieta Venegas, called Sí. The song was named the 5th best song of the 2000s decade by Latin music website Club Fonograma.

Song information
The song was written by Coti Sorokin and Julieta Venegas. Venegas plays  the accordion, drum machine and keyboards on the track. It made the Billboard chart, and reached positions 31 and 13 on the Hot Latin Songs and Latin Pop Airplay respectively. Venegas performed a new version on piano for her MTV Unplugged in 2008.

Live performance
The Mexican hip hop group Cartel de Santa performed the song for the MTV Video Music Awards Latinoamérica 2004 in Miami, Florida.

Music video
The music video was filmed in Japan, and featured Venegas's twin sister Yvonne. It was directed by Rogelio Sikander. It begins with Julieta walking the streets of Tokyo and following her sister Yvonne. The two are dressed in the same clothes and have the same hairstyle (except for Yvonne having shorter hair). Animated flowers and plants begin to grow each time Julieta goes through a street and on anything she touches. The video ends with the sisters playing a crane game.

Track listing

CD Single
"Lento" — 4:03

Charts

Weekly charts

References

Julieta Venegas songs
Songs written by Julieta Venegas
2004 singles
Songs written by Coti
2003 songs
RCA Records singles